Reuven Ramaty High Energy Solar Spectroscopic Imager (RHESSI, originally High Energy Solar Spectroscopic Imager or HESSI or Explorer 81) was a NASA solar flare observatory. It was the sixth mission in the Small Explorer program (SMEX), selected in October 1997  and launched on 5 February 2002, at 20:58:12 UTC. Its primary mission was to explore the physics of particle acceleration and energy release in solar flares.

Spacecraft 
HESSI was renamed to RHESSI on 29 March 2002 in honor of Dr. Ramaty, a pioneer in the area of high energy solar physics. RHESSI was the first space mission named after a NASA scientist. RHESSI was built by Spectrum Astro for Goddard Space Flight Center and was operated by the Space Sciences Laboratory in Berkeley, California. The principal investigator from 2002 to 2012 was Robert Lin, who was succeeded by Säm Krucker.

The entire spacecraft rotated to provide the necessary signal modulation. The four, fixed solar panels were designed to provide enough gyroscopic moment to stabilize rotation about the solar vector. This largely eliminated the need for attitude control. The instrument detectors were nine high-purity germanium crystals. Each was cooled to cryogenic temperatures by a mechanical cryocooler. Germanium provided not only detections by the photoelectric effect, but inherent spectroscopy through the charge deposition of the incoming ray. The crystals are housed in a cryostat, and mounted with low-conductivity straps. A tubular telescope structure formed the bulk of the spacecraft. Its purpose was to hold the collimators above the Ge crystals at known, fixed positions.

The satellite bus consists of the structure and mechanisms, the power system (including the battery, solar panels, and control electronics), the attitude control system, thermal control, command and data handling (C&DH), and telecommunications. The spacecraft structure shown here provides support for the telescope and other components. It was manufactured out of aluminum parts to be light weight but strong. The equipment platform has a honeycomb structure to further reduce the weight. The spacecraft was manufactured in Gilbert, Arizona by Spectrum Astro, Inc.

The Imaging Telescope Assembly consists of the telescope tube, grid trays, Solar aspect system (SAS), and Roll angle system (RAS). It was constructed, assembled, aligned, and tested at the Paul Scherrer Institute in Switzerland. The front and rear grid trays are attached to the telescope tube. It maintains the separation and alignment of the trays. Nine grids are mounted on a grid tray at each end of the telescope tube. The grid pairs modulate the transmission of solar flare X-ray and gamma ray emissions through to the detectors as the spacecraft spins around the axis of the telescope tube. The modulated count rates in the nine detectors are used in computers on the ground to construct images of solar flares in different energy bands. The five coarse grids (square) were constructed by Van Beek Consultancy in Netherlands. The four fine grids (round) were constructed by Thermo Electron Tecomet in Massachusetts. All grids were characterized both optically and with X-rays at Goddard Space Flight Center before being shipped to the Paul Scherrer Institute for integration into the imaging telescope assembly.

The spectrometer contains nine germanium detectors that are positioned behind the nine grid pairs on the telescope. These artificially grown crystals, pure to over one part in a trillion, were manufactured by the ORTEC division of Perkin Elmer Instruments. When they are cooled to cryogenic temperatures and a high voltage is put across them (up to 4000 volts), they convert incoming X-rays and gamma-rays to pulses of electric current. The amount of current is proportional to the energy of the photon, and is measured by sensitive electronics designed at the Lawrence Lawrence Berkeley National Laboratory and the Space Sciences Laboratory, at Berkeley, California. The detectors are cooled with an electromechanical Stirling-cycle cryocooler (built by SunPower Inc., and flight qualified at Goddard Space Flight Center).

Mission concept 
RHESSI was designed to image solar flares in energetic photons from soft X-rays (~3 keV) to gamma rays (up to ~20 MeV) and to provide high resolution spectroscopy up to gamma-ray energies of ~20 MeV. Furthermore, it had the capability to perform spatially resolved spectroscopy with high spectral resolution.

Scientific objectives 
Researchers believe that much of the energy released during a flare is used to accelerate, to very high energies, electrons (emitting primarily X-rays) and protons and other ions (emitting primarily gamma rays). The new approach of the RHESSI mission was to combine, for the first time, high-resolution imaging in hard X-rays and gamma rays with high-resolution spectroscopy, so that a detailed energy spectrum can be obtained at each point of the image. This new approach enabled researchers to find out where these particles are accelerated and to what energies. Such information will advance understanding of the fundamental high-energy processes at the core of the solar flare problem.

The primary scientific objective of RHESSI was to understand the following processes that take place in the magnetized plasmas of the solar atmosphere during a flare:
 Impulsive energy release
 Particle acceleration
 Particle and energy transport

These high-energy processes play a major role at sites throughout the universe ranging from magnetospheres to active galaxies. Consequently, the importance of understanding these processes transcends the field of solar physics; it is one of the major goals of space physics and astrophysics.

The high energy processes of interest include the following:
 The rapid release of energy stored in unstable magnetic configurations
 The equally rapid conversion of this energy into the kinetic energy of hot plasma and accelerated particles (primarily electrons, protons and ions)
 The transport of these particles through the solar atmosphere and into interplanetary space
 The subsequent heating of the ambient solar atmosphere

These processes involve:
 Particle energies to many GeV
 Temperatures of tens or even hundreds of millions of degrees
 Densities as low as 100 million particles per square cm
 Spatial scales of tens of thousands of kilometers, and
 Magnetic containment times of seconds to hours

It is impossible to duplicate these conditions in laboratories on the Earth.

The acceleration of electrons is revealed by hard X-ray and gamma-ray bremsstrahlung while the acceleration of protons and ions is revealed by gamma-ray lines and continuum. The proximity of the Sun means not only that these high-energy emissions are orders of magnitude more intense than from any other cosmic source but also that they can be better resolved, both spatially and temporally.

Imaging 
Since X-rays are not easily reflected or refracted, imaging in X-rays is difficult. One solution to this problem is to selectively block the X-rays. If the X-rays are blocked in a way that depends on the direction of the incoming photons, then it may be possible to reconstruct an image. The imaging capability of RHESSI was based on a Fourier transform technique using a set of 9 Rotational Modulation Collimators (RMCs) as opposed to mirrors and lenses. Each RMC consisted of two sets of widely spaced, fine-scale linear grids. As the spacecraft rotated, these grids blocked and unblocked any X-rays which may have come from the Sun modulating the photon signal in time. The modulation could be measured with a detector having no spatial resolution placed behind the RMC since the spatial information was now stored in the time domain. The modulation pattern over half a rotation for a single RMC provided the amplitude and phase of many spatial Fourier components over a full range of angular orientations but for a small range of spatial source dimensions. Multiple RMCs, each with different slit widths, provided coverage over a full range of flare source sizes. Images were then reconstructed from the set of measured Fourier components in exact mathematical analogy to multi-baseline radio interferometry. RHESSI provided spatial resolution of 2 arcseconds at X-ray energies from ~4 keV to ~100 keV, 7 arcseconds to ~400 keV, and 36 arcseconds for gamma-ray lines and continuum emission above 1 MeV.

RHESSI could also see gamma rays coming from off-solar directions. The more energetic gamma rays passed through the spacecraft structure, and impacted the detectors from any angle. This mode was used to observe gamma-ray bursts (GRBs). The incoming gamma rays are not modulated by the grids, so positional and imaging information is not recorded. However, a crude position can still be derived by the fact that the detectors have front and rear pickups. Also, the detectors near the burst shielded the ones away from the burst. Comparing signal strengths around the nine crystals, and front-to-back, then gives a coarse, two-dimensional position in space.

When combined with high-resolution time stamps of the detector hits, the RHESSI solution can be cross-referenced on the ground with other spacecraft in the IPN (Interplanetary Network) to provide a fine solution. The large area and high sensitivities of the germanium crystal assembly made RHESSI a formidable IPN component. Even when other spacecraft can provide burst locations, few can provide as high-quality spectra of the burst (in both time and energy) as RHESSI. Rarely, however, a GRB occurred near the Sun, in the collimated field of view. The grids then provided full information, and RHESSI was able to provide a fine GRB location even without IPN correlation.

Experiment

Reuven Ramaty High-Energy Solar Spectroscopic Imager (RHESSI) 
RHESSI is intended to image at high resolution solar flares in X-rays and gamma rays. The X-rays and gamma rays covers an energy range of 3 keV-20 MeV with an energy resolution of about 1 keV and a spatial resolution of just a few seconds of arc. The tube rotates about its axis as the spacecraft spins at a rate of 15 rpm. During a rotation, a photon from any point on the Sun can either pass through a grid-pair or be blocked by one or other of the grids. This causes a modulation of the intensity of photons emanating from that point. The depth of modulation is zero for the photons arriving exactly along the spin axis and gradually increases to the off-axis photons. Behind each grid-pair is a cryogenic (75 K) germanium detector of 7.1 cm diameter and  thickness. The output from each of the nine detectors, at any given energy, can be Fourier-analyzed to provide a full two-dimensional spatial spectrum of an extended source region on the Sun. The full spatial spectrum is possible because each wire grid pair has a different slit width, spacing and wire thickness. Data accumulation is about 16 Gb during a 10-minutes rotation. The telemetry data was collected at Berkeley (California), Wallops Flight Facility (WFF), Virginia, Santiago, Chile and Weilheim, Germany. Science analysis of the data was involved close collaboration with many dedictated ground based and satellite based solar observatories. A secondary goal of RHESSI is to observe astronomical sources such as Crab Nebula.

Results 
RHESSI observations have changed our perspective on solar flares, particularly on high-energy processes in flares. RHESSI observations has led to numerous publications in scientific journals and presentations at conferences. Through 2017, RHESSI is referenced in 2,474 publications, books, and presentations.

 RHESSI was the first satellite to image gamma rays from a solar flare.
 RHESSI was the first satellite to accurately measure terrestrial gamma-ray flashes that come from thunderstorms, and RHESSI found that such flashes occur more often than thought and the gamma rays have a higher frequency on average than the average for cosmic sources.

Following communication difficulties, RHESSI ceased science operations on 11 April 2018 at 01:50 UTC. RHESSI was decommissioned on 16 August 2018, and remains in a stable low Earth orbit. However, since it has no means of propulsion, atmospheric drag will eventually pull the spacecraft into atmosphere of Earth, which may occur as early as 2022.

See also 

 Explorer program

References

External links 

 RHESSI website by NASA's Goddard Space Flight Center
 HESSI archive website by the Space Sciences Laboratory
 RHESSI data browser by the Space Sciences Laboratory
 RHESSI Science Nuggets, biweekly series explaining recent science results

Spacecraft launched in 2002
Satellites orbiting Earth
Explorers Program
Missions to the Sun
X-ray telescopes
Spacecraft launched by Pegasus rockets
Derelict satellites orbiting Earth
Spacecraft decommissioned in 2018